Defending champions Neal Skupski and Desirae Krawczyk defeated Matthew Ebden and Samantha Stosur in the final, 6–4, 6–3 to win the mixed doubles tennis title at the 2022 Wimbledon Championships. It was Skupski's second major title, and Krawczyk's fourth. They were the first team to win consecutive mixed doubles titles at Wimbledon since Cyril Suk and Helena Suková in 1997.

This was the first edition of the tournament to feature a champions tie-break (10-point tie-break), when the score reaches six games all in the third set, and the third edition to feature a final set tie-break. Mate Pavić, Sania Mirza, David Vega Hernández and Natela Dzalamidze were the first players to contest this tiebreak in the mixed doubles event, with the team of Pavić and Mirza winning the tiebreak 10–3 in their first-round match.

This was also the first edition of the mixed doubles event to feature 32 instead of 48 teams, and thus five instead of six rounds, with the final now moved from the last Sunday of competition ahead to the last Thursday.

Mirza was attempting to complete the career Grand Slam, but was defeated in the semifinals by Skupski and Krawczyk.

Seeds

Draw

Finals

Top half

Bottom half

Other entry information

Wild cards

Protected ranking

Alternates

Withdrawals
  Łukasz Kubot /  Marta Kostyuk → replaced by  Nikola Ćaćić /  Aleksandra Krunić
  Ken Skupski /  Heather Watson → replaced by  Joran Vliegen /  Ulrikke Eikeri

Notes

References

External links
 Mixed Doubles draw

X=Mixed Doubles
2021